Bothel is a Samtgemeinde ("collective municipality") in the district of Rotenburg, in Lower Saxony, Germany. Its seat is in the village Bothel.

The Samtgemeinde Bothel consists of the following municipalities:
 Bothel
 Brockel 
 Hemsbünde
 Hemslingen 
 Kirchwalsede
 Westerwalsede

External links 
  (German)

Samtgemeinden in Lower Saxony